Mörth is a surname. Notable people with the surname include:

Ingo Mörth (born 1949), Austrian sociologist
Tommy Mörth (born 1959), Swedish ice hockey player